Doctor Josser K.C. is a 1931 British comedy film directed by Norman Lee and starring Ernie Lotinga, Jack Hobbs and Molly Lamont. Made at Elstree Studios it was part of the Josser series of comedies featuring Lotinga. It is sometimes confused with another production P.C. Josser although they are separate films made at different studios by different directors.

Cast
 Ernie Lotinga as  Jimmy Josser
 Jack Hobbs as Dick O'Neill
 Molly Lamont as Betty O'Neill
 Joan Wyndham as Suzette
 Binnie Barnes as Rosa Wopp
 Harold Wilkinson as Golightly
 Arnold Bell as Dick Morris

References

Bibliography
 Low, Rachael. Filmmaking in 1930s Britain. George Allen & Unwin, 1985.
 Wood, Linda. British Films, 1927-1939. British Film Institute, 1986.

1931 films
British comedy films
1931 comedy films
Films shot at British International Pictures Studios
Films directed by Norman Lee
Films set in England
British black-and-white films
1930s English-language films
1930s British films